The Downward Road is the third album by Canadian power pop band The Pursuit of Happiness, released in 1993. The album peaked at #36 on the RPM Canadian Albums Chart. The album cover has several versions with different coloured backgrounds (red, blue, yellow and others).

For the recording of The Downward Road, the band spent nearly three months in Los Angeles under the direction of producer Ed Stasium. The recording process marked a departure from the band's first two albums, Love Junk and One Sided Story, which were recorded in ten days and two-and-a-half weeks, respectively, at Todd Rundgren's Utopia Sound Studios in Lake Hill, New York. Berg explained the difference in recording processes: "We did the first record with Todd (Rundgren) in three weeks. Whereas the record we did with Ed almost took three months. That was the first difference. The second was that Todd really went for the live thing. We all played together, and everything went down at the same time live, except for the vocals and guitar solos. Ed, on the other hand, is more conventional. That sounds odd ... but the way records are made now is the way Ed makes them, with more sweating on the details."

The two-and-a-half year interval between the release of The Downward Road and the band's previous effort, One Sided Story, was due to several factors, including the band's changing labels from Chrysalis to Mercury, waiting for producer Stasium to become available, and - finally - Mercury's shelving of the album for six months so it could be released in the new year.

Track listing
All songs written by Moe Berg, except as noted.
"Downward Road (Intro)" (0:26) (Roebuck Staples)
"Cigarette Dangles" (2:32)
"Nobody But Me" (3:20)
"I'm Ashamed of Myself" (3:48)
"Pressing Lips" (3:33)
"In Her Dreams" (3:18)
"Downward Road" (Revisited)" (3:12)
"Heavy Metal Tears" (2:31)
"Bored of You" (3:18)
"Love Theme from TPOH" (3:29)
"Forbidden World" (4:03)
"But I Do" (4:23)
"Crashing Down" (3:47)
"Honeytime" (3:08)
"Villa in Portugal" (3:28) (Berg, Jules Shear)
"Terrified" (3:16)

Personnel
 Moe Berg - guitar, vocals
 Kris Abbott - vocals, guitar
 Brad Barker - bass
 Dave Gilby - drums

Additional musicians

 Paul McCandless - oboe solo (12)
 Rachel Oldfield - vocals
 Todd Rundgren - guitar solo (10)
 Ed Stasium - percussion

References

1993 albums
The Pursuit of Happiness (band) albums
Albums produced by Ed Stasium
Mercury Records albums